Buckhaven High School was a six-year co-educational non-denominational comprehensive school in Buckhaven, Fife, Scotland. In the past, Buckhaven was Levenmouth's high school for pupils who passed their qualifying exam. The school's motto was Perseverando.

The school's origins dated back to the 1860s and for many years it occupied a site in College Street, Buckhaven. The most recent building was in use from 1957 until 2016, and in 1976 an extension was completed. The catchments for the school were Buckhaven Primary, Methilhill Primary, East Wemyss Primary, Coaltown of Wemyss Primary, Parkhill Primary, Kirkton of Largo Primary and Kennoway Primary. They also received pupils from out with the catchments who submitted placing requests.

Merger
In June 2012 Fife Council proposed that the school should merge with neighbouring Kirkland High School and Community College to create Levenmouth Academy. The plans were approved in April 2014 and the new school opened to pupils on 17 August 2016.

Notable former pupils
Stuart Baxter - football manager
Ruth Davidson - politician
William Gear, artist
David Mach - sculptor
Henry McLeish - politician
Emma Mitchell - Footballer
Clive Russell - actor
Safyaan Sharif - Cricketer

References

External links
Buckhaven High School's page on Scottish Schools Online

Secondary schools in Fife
Educational institutions disestablished in 2016
2016 disestablishments in Scotland
Levenmouth